Dayton Mall is a shopping mall in Miami Township, Montgomery County, Ohio, United States, a suburb of Dayton. The mall's anchor stores are Dick's Sporting Goods, DSW, Guitar Center, H&M, JCPenney, Kirkland's, LensCrafters, Macy's, Morris Home Furniture, Ross Dress for Less, and Ulta Beauty. There are 2 vacant anchor stores that were once Elder-Beerman and Sears. The mall was formerly owned by Washington Prime Group, a Columbus-based firm, which acquired the complex in 1997; it is managed and leased by Spinoso Real Estate Group.

History
The Edward J. DeBartolo Corporation announced the construction of the Dayton Mall in 1969. According to developers, it was the largest mall constructed between New York City and Chicago at the time. Over 100 stores were announced, including three anchor stores: J. C. Penney, Sears, and Rike's. Other major tenants included four smaller department stores: Metropolitan, Donenfeld's, Dunhill's, and Thal's. Other major tenants included a J.G. McCrory five and ten store, a Liberal supermarket, Orange Julius, Kinney Shoes, Thom McAn, Jo-Ann Fabrics, Hickory Farms of Ohio, Waldenbooks, Fanny Farmer, Gray Drug, Russell Stover, Lerner New York, Lane Bryant, The Limited, Frederick's of Hollywood, LeRoy's Jewelers, Hallmark Cards, and Chess King. Restaurants announced for the mall included Bresler's Ice Cream, Orange Julius, Hot Sam, Carousel Hot Dogs, Forum Cafeteria, and Vic Cassano's. There were also three outparcel tire and auto service centers. The Dayton Mall's official grand opening was held in 1970, although some stores were already in operation at the time, such as Rike's, Hickory Farms and the single-screen Dayton Mall Cinema.

Rike's, owned by Federated Department Stores, was merged with Federated's Shillito's in 1982 as Shillito–Rike's. The store changed names again in 1986 to Lazarus. After adopting the Lazarus-Macy's brand in 2003, the store fully adopted the Macy's name in 2005; it contains .

Several more stores were added when the Dayton Mall underwent two major renovations of its existing structure in 1984 and 1995-1996. In the first renovation, the interior of the east and west concourses was remodeled, as was the two-level main entrance. The central atrium area was also improved with a food court installed on its mezzanine.

On August 4, 1972, Cinema 2 opened on the mezzanine level; in October 1976, Cinemas 3 and 4 opened, also on the mezzanine, across from Cinema 2; Cinemas 5–8 opened in 1982, attached to the mall but with only exterior public entrances. Cinemas 2, 3 and 4 closed in 1993, 5–8 closed in 2000, and the original cinema closed in January 2001. Most of the cinema space was reutilized, but as of 2012, the space formerly housing Cinemas 3 and 4 remains unused behind a wall.

After the supermarket closed, its space was allocated to a Morrison's Cafeteria and a few other retailers in late 1980. In 1988, the restaurant was rebranded as Morrison's corporate sibling Sadie's Buffet & Grill. In April 1993, the restaurant was replaced by a Discovery Zone children's entertainment facility.

In the mid-1990s, a fourth anchor store was added in front of what had been the main entrance. The original  location became a Cincinnati-based McAlpin's in 1996 and then a Dayton-based Elder-Beerman in 1998; the store contained . After these renovations were completed, the Dayton Mall had nearly 150 retailers under one roof.

A  Designer Shoe Warehouse (DSW) store opened on July 9, 2000. Anticipated to open prior to the 2000 holiday shopping season, Discovery Zone was replaced by a  Linens 'n Things in early 2001; Linens 'n Things was considered a junior anchor of the mall. In addition, a new exterior public entrance and new public restrooms were added to this area of the mall.

The Greene Town Center, a retail and entertainment complex, opened in suburban Beavercreek in August 2006, prompting the Dayton Mall and The Mall at Fairfield Commons to extend their properties to attract more visitors. A , open-air, "lifestyle component" was added in the Dayton Mall's north parking lot, along Ohio State Route 725. Known as "The Village At Dayton Mall", it added twenty-five tenants and was dedicated in early 2007. With the completion of this addition, the Dayton Mall encompassed .

In 2012, the DSW store moved to a space in the "lifestyle" area of the mall formerly held by Borders Book Stores. In April 2012, Dick's Sporting Goods announced that it would relocate from a nearby location in Miamisburg and occupy the space held formerly by DSW and f.y.e. in the mall, adding another anchor tenant and boosting the mall's occupancy rate above 95 percent.

In November 2014, Doppelganger Laboratories opened a store in the Dayton Mall employing a Shapify Booth, manufactured by Luxembourg's Artec Group. The booth takes a 3D scan of a person, then 3D prints a lifelike, full-color miniature figurine of the person. This was the first retail use of the booth in the United States.

Linens & More for Less opened at the mall in 2010, taking space formerly occupied by Linens 'n Things. Linens & More for Less closed in November 2012; its space was taken over in May 2013 by H. H. Gregg, which relocated from Miamisburg. On April 7, 2017, H. H. Gregg announced that the entire chain was going out of business, and the store closed that May.

In 2015, Sears Holdings spun off 235 of its properties, including the Sears at Dayton Mall, into Seritage Growth Properties.

On October 25, 2017, it was announced that the freestanding Sears Auto Center would be converted to an Outback Steakhouse and another unnamed tenant.

In December 2017, the mall gained Internet fame in a prank by Dan the Meme Man in which a teenager sleds down an escalator while a man posing as a security guard threatens to call police if he goes down, leading to a dramatic chase after he follows through. The viral video popularized the phrases "Sled gang" and "Eat ass, smoke grass, and sled fast".

On June 2, 2018, Macy's opened its off-price store concept, a  Macy's Backstage outlet, within its mall location.

On June 20, 2018, it was announced that a Ross Dress for Less would open in the former H. H. Gregg location; it opened on October 12, 2019.

On July 26, 2018, it was announced that The RoomPlace would open a home furniture store in the mall. Sources initially disagreed as to the details. Trade magazine Furniture Today claimed that a  store was scheduled to open around late summer 2019. Trade magazine Shopping Centers Today claimed that the RoomPlace would move into an empty anchor store, however, a press release from mall owner Washington Prime Group stated that the store would be in newly-created inline space. In late November 2018, it was reported that Old Navy, with a Dayton Mall location, would open a store in the Austin Landing development, also in Miami Township. On January 30, 2019, the mall's Old Navy location closed and it was reported soon after that the RoomPlace would open in the former Old Navy space later in the year. The RoomPlace was still slated to join the mall as late as February 13, 2020. On February 25, 2020, it was announced that locally-based regional chain Morris Home Furniture would be opening instead in the space planned for The RoomPlace, with The RoomPlace confirming two days later that it had shelved its plans to enter the Dayton market. The Morris showroom was tentatively scheduled to open in spring 2020.

Elder-Beerman closed on August 29, 2018, due to the bankruptcy of parent company The Bon-Ton.

After an August 22, 2018 announcement that Sears would be closing as part of a plan to close 46 locations nationwide, the  store closed on November 25, 2018.

On November 27, 2019, it was announced that Washington Prime Group had purchased the former  space for $3.6 million. The company plans to redevelop the site, which contains  and was valued at over $6.4 million as of 2019.

Around December 28, 2021, or sometime prior, leasing and management of the mall was transferred to Spinoso Real Estate Group, a Syracuse, New York-based company, that at the time managed 32 U.S. malls. It was unknown if the mall's ownership had changed.

On August 22, 2022, it was reported that Crossroads Church had purchased the former Sears site, intending to relocate services from Bellbrook Middle School and other rented facilities to the mall location. Timeline and cost estimates are still to be determined as of the date of the report.

External links
Dayton Mall website
Spinoso Real Estate Group
Washington Prime Group

References

Shopping malls in Ohio
Shopping malls established in 1970
Economy of Dayton, Ohio
Buildings and structures in Montgomery County, Ohio
Miamisburg, Ohio
Washington Prime Group
Tourist attractions in Montgomery County, Ohio